Old Stone Church is a historic Presbyterian church located at Lewisburg, Greenbrier County, West Virginia.

History
The congregation formed in 1783 practicing in a log building until building two-story, rectangular limestone building in 1796.  An addition was built in 1830, making the building 75 feet by 44 feet in size. It features an open cupola belfry. One of its earliest and most well-known reverends was John McElhenney who served the church for over sixty years starting in 1808. During the American Civil War, it served as a hospital for both Union and Confederate forces. The pews of the church were removed so that more cots for soldiers could be brought in. After the Union victory at the Battle of Lewisburg, a trench was built by the side of the church to bury the Confederate dead. After the war, the soldiers were reburied at the Confederate Cemetery at Lewisburg.

It was listed on the National Register of Historic Places in 1976. The related Stone Manse was listed on the National Register of Historic Places in 2004.

Burials

Henry M. Mathews, Governor of West Virginia

List of burials at Find A Grave

References

External links

American Civil War sites in West Virginia
Buildings and structures in Greenbrier County, West Virginia
Greenbrier County, West Virginia in the American Civil War
National Register of Historic Places in Greenbrier County, West Virginia
Presbyterian churches in West Virginia
Churches on the National Register of Historic Places in West Virginia
Churches completed in 1796
Stone churches in West Virginia
Historic American Buildings Survey in West Virginia
Limestone churches in the United States
18th-century Presbyterian church buildings in the United States
1796 establishments in Virginia
American Civil War hospitals